The 1992 Victorian state election, held on Saturday, 3 October 1992, was for the 52nd Parliament of Victoria. It was held in the Australian state of Victoria to elect all 88 members of the state's Legislative Assembly and 22 members of the 44-member Legislative Council.

The Labor government of Premier Joan Kirner, who had replaced John Cain on 10 August 1990, was defeated in a landslide by the Liberal–National Coalition led by Jeff Kennett and Pat McNamara, who had campaigned on comprehensive economic and structural reform as well as changes to industrial relations. It was the largest majority that the Coalition had ever won in Victoria.

Background
At the 1988 state election, the Labor government had won a third term, gaining 46 of the 88 Legislative Assembly seats, but was sent reeling by a budget crisis. Despite this, polling indicated that the Liberal Opposition had been unable to gain any ground under Alan Brown, who had succeeded Jeff Kennett on 23 May 1989. Brown was, however, able to persuade the Nationals to agree to contest the next election as a Coalition, the first time the two main non-Labor parties in Victoria had fought an election together since 1950. The Liberals had actually won a majority of the two-party vote in 1988, but came up five seats short of achieving government. It was believed that they had lost seats due to a number of three-cornered contests in rural areas.

Cain soon realised that Labor would be heavily defeated if he took the party into the next election. He resigned in 1990, and was succeeded by Deputy Premier and Education Minister Joan Kirner.  While Kirner was able to win some respect, she was unable to change Labor's fortunes. Prospects for a fourth Labor term became even more remote when Kennett's supporters launched a party room coup that returned him to the leadership on 23 April 1991.

Kirner waited as long as she could before calling the election. While she remained more personally popular than Kennett, commentators had almost universally written off Labor by this time. The Coalition had been well ahead in opinion polling for over two years, and it was obvious almost as soon as the writs were dropped that Kennett would be Victoria's next premier.

Results

Legislative Assembly

|}

Legislative Council

|}

The Labor government was defeated by the Coalition, with the latter winning 61 seats of 88 contested in the Assembly on an 8% swing against the Government, and 17 of 22 in the council with a swing of over 9%. It was the second-largest defeat that a sitting government has ever suffered in Victoria.  This did, however, represent a considerable improvement in the Government's stocks from the 22-25% indicated in opinion polls in 1990 and 1991. The Liberals made gains primarily in the eastern suburbs of Melbourne as well as provincial Victoria.  Eight members of Kirner's cabinet were defeated.

The Liberals actually won 52 seats, enough for a majority in their own right.  Although Kennett thus had no need for National support, the Coalition was retained.

Maps

Seats changing hands

Ballarat East was the new name for the abolished district of Ballarat South, of which Labor MP Frank Sheehan was the sitting member. It was a notional Liberal seat.
Bellarine and Box Hill became notional Liberal seats in the redistribution.

Background
Both the government and opposition had gone through changes during the 1988–1992 term of Parliament. The Labor government, in power since the 1982 election, was dogged in its final term by a series of scandals and major corporate collapses which, like neighbouring South Australia, extended and deepened the early 1990s recession in those states. Unemployment reached 11.6% in Victoria in March 1992, with the manufacturing and textiles sector being particularly affected, while state debt was estimated at A$30 billion. The State Bank of Victoria, the Victorian Economic Development Corporation (VEDC), Tricontinental and Pyramid Building Society failed, whilst the government-backed WorkCare insurance scheme was not in good shape. The Liberal party commenced an advertising campaign in January 1992 with the slogan "Labor: the Guilty Party".

The 1990 federal election was the first major sign that all was not well for Victorian Labor, with the Coalition gaining nine seats at Labor's expense. Ultimately, John Cain resigned on 7 August 1990, and on 10 August, Joan Kirner was elected leader. Despite her own personal popularity, support for the government had fallen to 22% by December, with analysts citing concerns over the state debt, lack of confidence in Victorian financial institutions, industrial relations problems and the severity of the recession's effects in the state as the primary reasons for the low ratings.

Meanwhile, on 23 May 1989, Jeff Kennett was dumped as leader of the Liberal Party by his colleagues in favour of Alan Brown; Brown led the party until 23 April 1991 when he was himself dumped in a party room spill. During Brown's period as Opposition Leader, the Liberals negotiated the first coalition agreement with the Nationals in over forty years, in part due to a belief by some (in spite of what political scientist Brian Costar called a "lack of psephological evidence to support this assertion") that had the parties been in coalition at the election, they would have won.

Key dates

See also
Candidates of the 1992 Victorian state election

References

Elections in Victoria (Australia)
1992 elections in Australia
1990s in Victoria (Australia)
October 1992 events in Australia